Mweka Airport  is an airport serving the town of Mweka in Democratic Republic of the Congo.

See also

Transport in the Democratic Republic of the Congo
List of airports in the Democratic Republic of the Congo

References

External links
 OpenStreetMap - Mweka Airport
 OurAirports - Mweka
 Mweka
 HERE Maps - Mweka

Airports in Kasaï Province